German submarine U-243 was a Type VIIC U-boat of Nazi Germany's Kriegsmarine during World War II.

An order was placed for U-243 on 10 April 1941 and construction began on 28 October 1942 at Friedrich Krupp Germaniawerft, Kiel, as yard number 677. She was launched the following year on 2 September 1943 and commissioned on 2 October 1943 under the command of Oberleutnant zur See Hans Märtens. Three days into her only patrol, she shot a German aircraft down.

She was sunk in the Bay of Biscay on 8 July 1944.

Design
German Type VIIC submarines were preceded by the shorter Type VIIB submarines. U-243 had a displacement of  when at the surface and  while submerged. She had two shafts and two  propellers.

U-243 was fitted with five  torpedo tubes (four fitted at the bow and one at the stern), fourteen torpedoes, one  SK C/35 naval gun, (220 rounds), one  Flak M42 and two twin  C/30 anti-aircraft guns. The boat had a complement of between forty-four and sixty.

Service history
Her only patrol was preceded by a short voyage from Kiel to Flekkefjord in southern Norway in May 1944.

She passed through the gap between Iceland and the Faroe Islands and steamed south, heading for the French Atlantic ports.

She was attacked and sunk by a Sunderland flying boat of No. 10 Squadron RAAF in the Bay of Biscay on 8 July 1944. Eleven men died; there were 38 survivors.

See also
 Battle of the Atlantic

References

Bibliography

External links

German Type VIIC submarines
U-boats commissioned in 1943
U-boats sunk in 1944
World War II shipwrecks in the North Sea
World War II submarines of Germany
1943 ships
Ships built in Kiel
U-boats sunk by Australian aircraft
U-boats sunk by depth charges
Maritime incidents in July 1944